

The Blériot 127 (or Bl-127) was a French bomber aircraft of the 1920s and 1930s, developed from the Blériot 117 escort fighter.  It was a large monoplane of conventional configuration that featured open gunner's positions in its nose and at the rear of its two underwing engine nacelles.  The wing airfoil was of sufficient thickness that these latter positions could be accessed from the fuselage in flight.

Forty-two aircraft were operated by the Armée de l'Air from 1929 until 1934, by which time they were thoroughly obsolete.

Variants
 127/1 - Prototype with Hispano-Suiza 12Gb W-12 piston engines.
 127/2 - Main production version, fitted with two Hispano-Suiza 12Hb  V-12 piston engines.
 127/3 - Single prototype of night bomber version.
 127/4 - Single conversion of 127/4 with revised undercarriage.
 137 - All-metal high-wing prototype designed in order to meet the requirements of the Service Technique de l'Aéronautique (STAé) of the French government towards the end of the 1920s for a light bomber and reconnaissance plane type designated as Multiplace de Combat. The two aircraft built, (Bl-137 M0 and M1), were eliminated from competition in favour of the competing Amiot 143. Other Multiplace de Combat prototypes built at the time, such as the SPCA 30 and the Breguet 410, underwent a similar fate to the Blériot 137.

Operators

French Air Force

Specifications (Blériot Bl-127/2)

References

Further reading
 
 

127
1920s French bomber aircraft
Aircraft first flown in 1926
Twin piston-engined tractor aircraft